Bernadett Bódi (born 9 March 1986) is a Hungarian handballer.

She made her international debut on 2 March 2005 against Denmark. She competed at the 2008 Summer Olympics in Beijing, where the Hungarian team finished fourth, after losing 20–22 to Russia in the semifinal, and 28–33 to South Korea in the bronze match.

She also played in five European Championships (2008, 2010, 2012, 2014, 2016), and participated in the World Championship in 2009, 2013, 2015 and in 2017.

Achievements
Domestic competitions
Nemzeti Bajnokság I:
Winner: 2005, 2006, 2014, 2016, 2017, 2018, 2019
Silver Medallist: 2004, 2007, 2015
Bronze Medallist: 2002, 2003
Magyar Kupa:
Winner: 2005, 2006, 2007, 2014, 2015, 2016, 2018, 2019
Silver Medallist: 2017
Bronze Medallist: 2010
European competitions
Women's EHF Champions League:
Winner: 2014, 2017, 2018, 2019
Silver Medallist: 2016
EHF Cup:
Finalist: 2002, 2004, 2005
National team
Junior European Championship:
Silver Medallist: 2002
Junior World Championship:
Silver Medallist: 2003
European Championship:
Bronze Medalist: 2012

References

External links
Career statistics on Worldhandball.com

1986 births
Living people
Sportspeople from Szeged
Hungarian female handball players
Olympic handball players of Hungary
Handball players at the 2008 Summer Olympics
Expatriate handball players
Hungarian expatriates in Denmark
Győri Audi ETO KC players
Békéscsabai Előre NKSE players
Siófok KC players